The 1984 Sacramento State Hornets football team represented California State University, Sacramento as a member of the Northern California Athletic Conference (NCAC) during the 1984 NCAA Division II football season. Led by seventh-year head coach Bob Mattos, Sacramento State compiled an overall record of 6–5 with a mark of 5–1 in conference play, placing second in the NCAC. The team outscored its opponents 277 to 218 for the season. The Hornets played home games at Hornet Stadium in Sacramento, California.

This was the last year that Sacramento State played in the NCAC. In 1985, the team moved to the Western Football Conference (WFC).

Schedule

References

Sacramento State
Sacramento State Hornets football seasons
Sacramento State Hornets football